Below is a list of all poker players who have won multiple World Series of Poker (WSOP) bracelets, together with the year(s) in which the bracelets were won.

List of all time

List by decade

Three Bracelets in One Year
The first person to win three bracelets in the same WSOP was Walter "Puggy" Pearson, at the 1973 WSOP.  Since 1973, only five other players have won three bracelets in a single year, which encompasses the WSOP and either the WSOPE or WSOP APAC.

Other records
Johnny Moss, with a win at the 1971 WSOP, became the first person to have won multiple lifetime WSOP bracelets.

Moss also was the first person to win 5 lifetime WSOP bracelets, with a win at the 1975 WSOP.

Johnny Chan, with a win in Event #25 at the 2005 WSOP, became the first person to win 10 lifetime WSOP bracelets, just a few days before Doyle Brunson won his 10th bracelet in Event #31 of that same WSOP.

Phil Hellmuth, with a win in Event #15 at the 2007 WSOP, became the first person to win 11 WSOP bracelets. As of the end of the 2010 series, Hellmuth holds the record for most WSOP bracelets won. He extended his record to 12 bracelets at the 2012 WSOP when he won Event #18, a Razz tournament, for his first-ever non-Hold'em bracelet. Later that year at the WSOP Europe, he won the Main Event for his 13th bracelet, which also made him the first player to win both the WSOP and WSOP Europe Main Events.

The first person to win 2 bracelets in the same WSOP was Johnny Moss, at the 1971 WSOP.

With his win in $3,000 H.O.R.S.E., in 2010, Phil Ivey became the player with the most non-Hold'em bracelets (8). He extended his record to 9 by winning the A$2,200 Mixed Event at the 2013 WSOP APAC.  He became the first with 10 non-hold'em bracelets by winning the $1,500 Eight Game Mix event at the 2014 World Series of Poker.  Ivey also holds the record for most bracelets won in games featuring more than one poker game (known as mixed game poker) with 5.  Prior to his 2013 WSOP APAC win, he won bracelets in S.H.O.E. (2002), Omaha/Seven Card Stud HL/8 or Better (2009), and H.O.R.S.E. (2010).

In 2013, with his wins in $1,500 and $5,000 H.O.R.S.E., Tom Schneider became the first player in WSOP history to win multiple mixed game bracelets in the same year.

External links
 WSOP Players & Results at WSOP official website

References